Paolo Bianchini (born 1931) is an Italian director and screenwriter.

Life and career 
Born in Rome, Bianchini began his career in 1953 working as  assistant director of a number of notable directors, including  Mario Monicelli, Luigi Comencini, Vittorio De Sica, Mauro Bolognini and particularly  Luigi Zampa, with whom he collaborated several times. From the second half of the 1960 Bianchini was also active as a director and a screenwriter, specializing in low-budget genre films. Starting from the 1970s he focused his work on television and advertising commercials.

Selected filmography 
 Our Men in Bagdad (1966)
 Massacre Mania (1967) 
 The Devil's Man (1967) 
 Superargo and the Faceless Giants (1968) 
 I Want Him Dead (1968)
 God Made Them... I Kill Them (1968) 
 Gatling Gun (1968)
 Hey Amigo! A Toast to Your Death (1970)

References

External links 
 

1931 births
20th-century Italian people
Italian film directors
Italian television directors
Italian screenwriters
Film people from Rome
Living people
Italian male screenwriters